Chunxi Road is a pedestrianized shopping street in Chengdu, the capital of China's Sichuan Province. More than 700 shops can be found here including large shopping malls, department stores, supermarkets, street stalls, and boutiques, as well as modern cafes, and a public square. Next to Chunxi Road is Yanshikou commercial circle. It is served by Lines 2 and 3 of the Chengdu Metro.

Origin
Although there is "a hundred Chunxi" said, but Chunxi Road was established by the warlord Yang Sen in 1924. Initially, Chunxi Road in Chengdu was named "Senwei Road" because of Yang Sen's title of "General Sen Wei" and was later taken from Lao Zi's "Moral Classics" as an allusion to "Everyone Hee Hee, If Enjoying Taijang, such as Dengchun Tai" , Renamed Chunxi Road, to describe the bustling commercial here, people bustling, prosperous prosperity scene.
Chunxi Road, originally intended to be built into a straight line, but at that time the General Hospital Fu Di pharmacy owner Zheng Shaofu is the French consulate's translation, and to refuse to demolition, Janssen had no choice but to compromise. Therefore, at Zhongshan Square (or Dr. Sun Yat-sen Square), Chunxi East Road and Chunxi Road, Chunxi Road and Chunxi North Road are staggered

Geography

Chunxi Road is about 1.1 km in length. As the shopping district grew, Chunxi Road began to refer to the entire area that is south of the East Main Street, East of New South Street, New Middle Street and New North Street, as well as south of Zongfu Road, covering about 20 hectares

The central area contains a small public square, Zhongshan Square (中山广场), with a statue of President Sun Yat-sen, next to a Häagen-Dazs shop.

History
With a history of 85 years, Chunxi Road is the most famous commercial pedestrian street in Chengdu. It was named Chunxi Road in 1924, and is also nicknamed the "Hundred Year Gold Street"

Chunxi Road starts off a narrow alley connected to the Zouma Street, creating a straight path leading from north to south, intercepting the East Main Street. With the East Main Street being the only path leading down to the East of Sichuan, it resulted in huge volume of traffic along the road. Merchants used to gather here, and the road was further developed by the officials then. It solidified its present status during the Warlord era of the Republican period

As the Japanese department stores Ito Yokado and Isetan are located in the Chunxi Road shopping district, it was a site of the 2005 anti-Japanese demonstrations.

Department stores
There are six major department stores and shopping malls on Chunxi Road: Ito Yokado, Pacific Department Store, Wangfujing Department Store, Chicony, Isetan, Parkson, Sino-Ocean Taikoo Li, Chengdu IFS

See also
List of leading shopping streets and districts by city

References

External links

Travel China Guide
bashu.net
 春熙路.org

Streets in Chengdu
Tourist attractions in Chengdu
Shopping districts and streets in China
Pedestrian malls in China